Prinsvillan (the Prince Villa) is a villa on Germaniavägen 14 A in Djursholm by architects Axel Viktor Forsberg and Gustaf Hermansson. It is situated in the Grotte quarter near Djursholm Castle and is also called Grottevillan or Grotte 7.

The villa was initially built in 1905 by Forsberg, but was redesigned and expanded significantly during 1908–1909 by Hermansson in the jugend inspired country mansion style typical in Sweden at the turn of the 20th century.

The villa was built for Prince Erik, Duke of Västmanland (1889–1918), the youngest son of Gustaf V of Sweden, who suffered from epilepsy and lived a withdrawn life. It is, however, unclear when Prince Erik lived in the villa.

The villa has been privately owned since the 1960s and was during the 1990s a residence for the South African embassy in Sweden. It has been given a preservation order as a building of national cultural interest.

Sources
 Fredric Bedoire, Svenska slott och herrgårdar, Albert Bonniers Förlag 2006, 
 Olof Hultin, Guide till Stockholms arkitektur, Stockholm Arkitektur Förlag, 2002, 
 Staffan Skott, Alla dessa Bernadottar, Stockholm Bonnier, 1996,

References 

Buildings and structures in Stockholm County
Villas in Sweden
Houses completed in 1909